This is the list of military alliances. A military alliance is a formal agreement between two or more parties concerning national security in which the contracting parties agree to mutual protection and support in case of a crisis that has not been identified in advance. Military alliances differ from coalitions, which formed for a crisis that already exists. Numerous forms of military and defensive alliances have existed between states since early human history. This is a comprehensive list of the most important alliances.

Before AD 1200

1200–1699

1700–1899

1900–1999

2000–Present

Proposed alliances

See also
List of intergovernmental organizations
List of treaties
Major non-NATO ally

Notes

References

!
Alliances
Alliance treaties
Diplomacy-related lists